The Naharlagun – Dekargaon Passenger is a Passenger train of the Indian Railways, which runs between  near the capital city of Arunachal Pradesh and  of Assam state. It was the first train to Arunachal Pradesh of Northeast Frontier Railway. It is currently being operated with 55614/55613 train numbers on a daily basis

Coaches

It consists of ten general second sitting coaches and two guard cum luggage vans. The total composition is 12 coaches.

Loco
It is hauled by WDP-4B diesel loco of Siliguri Loco Shed in both directions.

References

Slow and fast passenger trains in India
Rail transport in Assam
Transport in Itanagar
Transport in Tezpur